Shimatani (written: 島谷 or 嶋谷) is a Japanese surname. Notable people with the surname include:

 (born 1980), Japanese singer
 (1938–2001), Japanese footballer

Japanese-language surnames